Emmalocera phaeostrotella is a species of snout moth in the genus Emmalocera. It was first described by George Hampson in 1918. It is found in Sri Lanka.

References

Moths described in 1918
Emmalocera